Strazhevtsi, Postalar in Turkish and Стражевци in Bulgarian is a village in Kardzhali, Kircaali in Turkish and Кърджали in Bulgarian) Municipality, Kardzhali Province, southern Bulgaria.

References

Villages in Kardzhali Province